The 2005–06 A1 Grand Prix of Nations, Malaysia was an A1 Grand Prix race, held on the weekend of November 20, 2005 at the Sepang International Circuit.

Report

Practice

Qualifying

Sprint race

Main race

Results

Qualification 

Qualification took place on Saturday, November 19, 2005, with rain beginning in earnest at the end of the second segment of qualification.

Sprint Race Results 

The Sprint Race took place on Sunday, November 20, 2005.

Main Race Results 

The Main Race took place on Sunday, November 20, 2005.

Total Points 

 Fastest Lap: A1 Team France (1'55.373 / 172.9 km/h, lap 5 of Sprint Race)
 A1 Team India was excluded from the Feature Race, after receiving a push start from the marshals.

References

Malaysia
A1 Grand Prix